Cyclophora circummaculata is a moth in the family Geometridae. It is found on Borneo and Peninsular Malaysia. The habitat consists of upper montane forests.

The central part of both wings is medium dull brownish red, with patches of the pale yellow ground colour only found at the margins of the wings.

References

Moths described in 1976
Cyclophora (moth)
Moths of Asia